St Michael and All Angels’ Church, Appleby Magna is a Grade II* listed parish church in the Church of England in Appleby Magna, Leicestershire

History
The church dates from c.1300 but much of it is 14th century. St. Helen's Chapel was incorporated into the north east section of the church and served as both a private chapel and burial site for the de Appleby family. Most of the tombs have been removed but the Alabaster effigies of Sir Edmund de Appleby and his wife Joan, dating from 1375, still survive. The chapel would eventually become known as the de Appleby Chapel although it is currently used as the church vestry.

It was restored in 1827.

Parish status
The church is in a joint parish with:
St John's Church, Donisthorpe
St Laurence's Church, Measham
Holy Trinity Church, Normanton le Heath
The Holy Rood Church, Packington
Holy Trinity Church, Norton-Juxta-Twycross
St Bartholomew's Church, Snarestone
St Peter's Church, Swepstone

Organ
The church contains a pipe organ of 2 manuals and pedals by W Hawkins and Son dating from 1964. A specification of the organ can be found on the National Pipe Organ Register.

Organists
William Riley 1863-1895 
William Riley 1898-1931

The Bells
The peal of six bells dates from 1619, 1769, 1911 and 1982.

References

Church of England church buildings in Leicestershire
Grade II* listed buildings in Leicestershire